我的答鈴 My Darling is name of the second album by Singaporean singer Jocie Kok.

Track listing 
Songs on 2007 album 我的答鈴 My Darling include:
 我的答鈴 (My Darling)
 愛情女神 (Love Goddess) 
 只愛他 (I Only Love Him) 
 不要怕 (Don't be Afraid) 
 老虎老虎 (Tiger Tiger) 
 幸福接力賽 (Happiness Relay Race) 
 左手邊 (Left-Hand Side) 
 Kiwi Kiwi (奇異果) 
 我不是你的超女 (I'm Not Your SuperGirl) 
 夏日完結篇 (Summer Finale) 
 美麗美麗聖誕 (Merry Merry X'mas) 
 新年快樂，我的愛 (Happy New Year, My Love) 
 我的答鈴 (My Darling) -Dance Remix- 
 我的答鈴 (My Darling) -eXr Remix- 
 愛情女神 (Love Goddess) -Goddess Remix Edit-

Additional information for (CD+DVD) version; please see discography on Jocie Kok's page for more information on the (CD+DVD version)
May 2007 (CD+DVD) release of 我的答鈴 My Darling contains two bonus tracks on the track list:

May 2007 (CD+DVD) release of 我的答鈴 My Darling contains a DVD with music videos for:
 我的答鈴 (My Darling)
 愛情女神 (Love Goddess)
 左手邊 (Left-Hand Side),
 夏日完結篇 (Summer Finale)
 不要怕 (Don't be Afraid)

References

Jocie Kok albums
2007 albums